Hibhib (Hibhib Village) is a village in Iraq, located   northwest of Baquba. It is predominantly Sunni Arab.

History

The former leader of Al Qaeda in Iraq, Jordanian-born militant Abu Musab al-Zarqawi, maintained a safehouse in the village. On June 7, 2006, while meeting in the safehouse with his spiritual adviser, he was bombed and killed by U.S.-led coalition aircraft.

References

Populated places in Diyala Province